The Halle synagogue shooting occurred on 9 October 2019 in Halle, Saxony-Anhalt, Germany, and continued in nearby Landsberg. After unsuccessfully trying to enter the synagogue in Halle during the Jewish holiday of Yom Kippur, the attacker, later identified as 27-year-old Stephan Balliet, fatally shot two people nearby and later injured two others.

Federal investigators called the attack far-right and antisemitic terrorism. The federal Public Prosecutor General took over the investigation and declared it to be a "violation of Germany's internal security." Balliet, a German neo-Nazi from Saxony-Anhalt, was charged with two counts of murder and seven counts of attempted murder.

On 10 November 2019, Balliet confessed to the charges before an investigative judge at the Federal Court of Justice. On 21 December 2020, he was sentenced to life imprisonment with subsequent preventive detention.

Background 
German authorities said the threat of far-right attacks had increased with the number of extremists and fringe groups increasing by 50 percent in the two years prior to April 2019. Citing interior ministry figures, it was reported that some 12,700 Germans were inclined towards violence, of an estimated 24,000 far-right extremists. In 2018, anti-Semitic crime and hate crime targeting foreigners each increased by almost 20 percent in Germany. The perpetrator of the Halle attack also linked his crime to the June 2019 killing of Walter Lübcke, who was backing Germany's refugee policy.

All Jewish facilities in Germany are entitled to state security precautions. The police protection of Jewish facilities is a consequence of the Munich massacre in 1972. It is the responsibility of the Bundesländer, and carried out by the state police forces. Nevertheless, the state police of Saxony-Anhalt was not present and carried out no extra security precautions at the Halle synagogue for Yom Kippur in 2019. Daniel Neumann, director of the state union of Jewish communities in Hesse, said that smaller Jewish congregations do not have the financial resources for advanced security gear, including security doors and CCTV.

Attack 

The attack started around noon, on the Jewish holy day of Yom Kippur, at the synagogue in the Paulusviertel neighborhood of Halle. The attacker, Stephan Balliet, arrived there after a 45-minute drive from Benndorf, where he lived with his mother. He live-streamed himself trying, but failing, to enter the synagogue. The gunman shot at the door's lock repeatedly and set off an explosive but the door was not breached, in part because the synagogue's security system had been recently upgraded. The upgrade included a security camera which allowed the 51 congregants inside to view Balliet's attempts to enter the synagogue. Balliet tried to enter the synagogue yard, firing shots and trying to ignite homemade explosives. At 12.03 p.m., a 112-distress call reached Halle fire-emergency HQ; one minute later, police were informed. At 2.40 p.m., federal police quick responders BFE+ arrived in the city of Halle.

A female passer-by was shot several times and killed near the entrance to the Jewish cemetery next to the synagogue, after reprimanding Balliet for making noise. A man who stopped his vehicle to check on this woman was able to get away unharmed when Balliet's weapon failed to fire.

After killing the woman, Balliet drove to a nearby Turkish kebab shop. There, he opened fire through the front window. A customer in the shop was injured and later killed when Balliet re-entered the shop.

Authorities said they were dealing with a "rampage situation", activated the Public Alert System Katwarn, and advised the local community to stay at home and closed the city's train station.

Balliet fled in a rented Volkswagen, leading police on an  chase from Halle. At about 4.00p.m., a helicopter of the federal police landed in Wiedersdorf. Several police force personnel carriers and two ambulances were already present.

Victims 
A 40-year-old woman from Halle who was passing by on the street near the synagogue when she was shot dead was the first victim in the shooting. In the kebab shop, Balliet shot dead a 20-year-old man from Merseburg. In his flight, Balliet shot at a couple in Landsberg, wounding a 40-year-old woman and a 41-year-old man. The two were admitted to Halle's university hospital with gunshot wounds and successfully underwent surgery.

Investigation 
In the first hours after the attack, security services worked on the assumption of multiple perpetrators. Later in the afternoon, Saxony-Anhalt's state minister of the interior Holger Stahlknecht declared that there was only one attacker, who had been arrested, and that it was being investigated whether the man had been part of a social environment or networks.

The Federal Prosecutor (Generalbundesanwalt) took over the investigation since the attack was a potential violation of Germany's internal security. The prosecutor indicated that it was investigating a "murder with special significance." According to the prosecutor's spokesperson, there are currently no indications of a terrorist organisation being involved. Security sources said the then-unidentified suspect was a German national who had no prior criminal history, and that the indications of a right-wing extremist background became stronger.

On 10 October, police searched Balliet's house in Benndorf near Eisleben.

Balliet used the streaming service Twitch to broadcast his attacks. According to Twitch, that stream was not listed in the recommendations of the site or made public in any other way. This means that he had to specifically send the link to people to lead them to the stream.

Perpetrator 

The perpetrator, a male 27-year-old German neo-Nazi, was named by the media as Stephan Balliet, who lived in an apartment in Benndorf near Eisleben. He grew up in Saxony-Anhalt and learned to handle weapons during his time in the German armed forces, having done his six-month military service in a Panzergrenadier battalion as an 18-year-old. There, he was trained on the use of the HK G36 assault rifle and the HK P8 pistol. No evidence of right-wing beliefs were found in his military file. He studied "molecular and structural product design" for one year at the age of 22, and after that chemistry for one year at Halle University.

Federal investigators said Balliet had "almost certainly a far-right motivation for the crime." Comparisons were drawn between the Christchurch mosque shootings, where the shooter live-streamed his own attacks on Facebook for nearly 17 minutes. Like the perpetrator of those shootings, Balliet streamed the attack online with video and audio from his action camera on his helmet. The entire footage lasted about 35 minutes and was streamed to the gaming website Twitch. The video shows Balliet displaying his weapons and speaking extreme antisemitic content in "poor English." In the evening, Federal Minister of the Interior Horst Seehofer said it was "at least" an antisemitic attack.

In the livestream, Balliet denied the Holocaust and claimed feminism led to fewer births, leading to mass immigration; he blamed "the Jew" for those issues. During the attack, Balliet's homemade explosives repeatedly malfunctioned, and he referred to himself as "a loser", being unable to breach any of the synagogue's doors, shooting his own tire by accident, and being unable to fire his gun.

In addition to the video, Balliet also left a manifesto, which was discovered by The International Centre for the Study of Radicalisation and Political Violence in London. According to the manifesto, his goal had been to "Kill as many anti-Whites as possible, Jews preferred." Citing a terrorism expert, Spiegel wrote that it was "significant that the attacker wrote and published his manifesto in English ... his heroes were people like Breivik and NZ, El Paso attackers". The manifesto, steeped in antisemitic and neo-Nazi messages, contained photos and descriptions of his homemade weapons arsenal and information about his intentions. Balliet claimed to have chosen the Halle synagogue as the target because it was the closest place where he could find "the Jew." He wrote that "if he could kill only one Jew, that was worth the attack." His manifesto showed his belief in a "Jewish world conspiracy." As a means to mock victims and to gain infamy, and show that he enjoyed his crime, he used modern internet far-right-slang and "sarcastic" neo-Nazi "meme language" and far-right imagery often found on forums such as 4chan. It emerged that Balliet was in possession of material by Atomwaffen Division Deutschland, but the extent of his relationship to the group is unclear.

Balliet announced his plans on an imageboard called Meguca, which was shut down shortly after the shooting. On such boards, Spiegel wrote, users "can dive into pictures and cynical jokes and anonymously post ultra-radical views." The contents extend to violence against Jews, Muslims, migrants, and women. There, Balliet wrote that he had made DIY weapons in recent years using a 3D printer and that anyone who wanted to could watch him in a "live test" via a link to his live-stream.

Criminal charges and trial 
On 11 October 2019, during a court hearing in front of the investigating judge of the Federal Court of Justice, Balliet confessed to the crime and also confirmed a right-wing extremist, antisemitic motive. His lawyer confirmed the confession. According to investigators, Balliet hoped to inspire others to perpetrate similar right-wing extremist and anti-Semitic acts.

On 21 April 2020, German prosecutors announced they had filed charges against Balliet, including two charges of murder, attempted murder of 68 people, incitement, bodily harm, and predatory extortion.

Balliet was sent from Saxony-Anhalt to the Federal Court of Justice, (Bundesgerichtshof) in Karlsruhe. The court appointed local lawyer Hans-Dieter Weber as Balliet's defence counsel. At their first meeting Balliet asked Weber if he was Jewish, and when the lawyer said no, responded, "Even if you were a Jew, I would not reject you now." Weber said that by recording the crime, Balliet had himself provided evidence. Asked about possible role models for his crime, Balliet said, he was "aware of" and "followed" major assassinations, as well as the 2011 Norway attacks and the Christchurch mosque shootings; he denied that he had been motivated by these crimes.

On 21 December 2020, the Higher Regional Court of Naumburg sentenced Balliet to life imprisonment with subsequent preventive detention, the highest possible sentence in German law, and deemed the defendant to have a severe gravity of guilt, which effectively ruled out a release after 15 years in prison.

Escape attempts 
In June 2020, Balliet attempted to escape from prison, climbing an 11-foot (3.4 m) fence during a recreation period. He was recaptured five minutes later, and transferred to a maximum security prison.

On 12 December 2022, Balliet took two prison guards hostage using a device during an escape attempt. Within an hour Balliet was overwhelmed and captured. He was injured during his capture but the two hostages were unharmed. On 20 December 2022, Balliet was transferred to Augsburg-Gablingen prison in Bavaria as a result of the incident.

Reactions 
At the event commemorating the 30th anniversary of the peaceful revolution in Leipzig, German President Frank-Walter Steinmeier called for solidarity with fellow citizens who were Jewish. Chancellor Angela Merkel also offered her condolences to the families of the victims and took part in a night vigil in front of Berlin's New Synagogue.

The members of the European Parliament stood for a minute of silence on the day of the attack to honour the victims and send condolences to the families.

Josef Schuster, president of the Central Council of Jews in Germany, told TV station Das Erste that on the day of the attack there were no police patrols close to the Jewish facility in Halle. If the regular police force had been there, the second murder in the shop could have been avoided, Schuster said. He described it as "scandalous" that "the synagogue in Halle was not protected by the police on a holiday like Yom Kippur."

The New Zealand government's Office of Film and Literature Classification also classified the suspect's livestream footage of the shootings as objectionable, making it illegal to download or distribute in New Zealand. The Chief Censor David Shanks likened the content and filming of the video to the Christchurch mosque shootings in March 2019.

The day after the attack, Spiegel Online published an article citing political scientist Matthias Quent, entitled: "The lone offender, who was not alone." Quent claimed that the perpetrator was part of a large virtual network, and that the fact that he streamed the act live and spoke in English displays the importance of this far-right "Human Haters International" for him. Especially because of the far-right subculture on the internet, it is difficult to avoid such acts, Quent said, since that subculture is not yet fully grasped by security services and social media law enforcement legislation, also he claims there is "barely any research" on the process of how radicalization occurs there.

Security for Jewish institutions across the country was increased.

A day after the attack, Thuringia's Minister for Interior Georg Maier (SPD) and the Bavarian Minister for Interior Joachim Herrmann (CSU) called the nationalistic-völkisch politician Björn Höcke to account. Maier said that Höcke and his party Alternative for Germany (AfD) were responsible for attacks like this, while they would be "moral arsonists", feeding antisemitic resentments. Jörg Meuthen, the AfD federal spokesman, strongly condemned the attack.

According to the Jewish Telegraphic Agency, "More than 10,000 people marched in Berlin against anti-Semitism and in a show of support for the victims of anti-Semitic violence in the city of Halle" a few days after the attack.

The ruling Islamist political party and military organization of the Gaza Strip, Hamas, denounced the shooting stating it "poses a danger for all people and that terrorism has no religion or is not restricted to a single nation."

See also
 List of right-wing terrorist attacks
 2020 Hanau shootings
 Christchurch mosque shootings
 Pittsburgh synagogue shooting
 Poway synagogue shooting
 Jewish Museum of Belgium shooting
 Buffalo supermarket shooting, alleged racially-motivated attack which was livestreamed on Twitch
 Antisemitism in Germany

References 

2019 murders in Germany
2020s trials
21st-century attacks on synagogues and Jewish communal organizations
21st century in Saxony-Anhalt
Antisemitic attacks and incidents in Europe
Antisemitism in Germany
Attacks on buildings and structures in 2019
Attacks on buildings and structures in Germany
Crime in Saxony-Anhalt
Far-right politics in Germany
Filmed killings
Synagogue shooting
Hate crimes in Europe
Livestreamed crimes
Murder in Saxony-Anhalt
Murder trials
Neo-Nazi attacks in Germany
October 2019 crimes in Europe
October 2019 events in Germany
Right-wing antisemitism
Spree shootings in Germany
Terrorist incidents in Germany in 2019
Trials in Germany
Yom Kippur
Mass shootings in Germany